Wisconsin Highway 177 (WIS 177) was a state highway in Wisconsin. It traveled from WIS 42 to Point Beach State Forest.

Route description
Starting at its western terminus, WIS 177 traveled eastward from WIS 42. It then curved southeast and then back east again. Continuing east, it abruptly ended next to Lake Michigan.

History
In 1951, WIS 177 was formed. The route resembled a spur of WIS 42. It traveled from WIS 42 to the Point Beach State Forest. During its existence, no significant changes were made. Around 1985, CTH-V extended east towards the state forest, superseding the whole of WIS 177. The change remains like this to this day.

Major intersections

Reference

177
Transportation in Manitowoc County, Wisconsin